Europlema desistaria is a species of moth of the family Uraniidae first described by Francis Walker in 1861. It is found in India, Sri Lanka, Myanmar, Thailand, Taiwan, Borneo, Sulawesi, Flores and Queensland.

Description 
The moth's wingspan is about 24 mm. Its forewings have an evenly curved outer margin, and its hindwings have slight tails at veins 4 and 7. Its head and collar are fuscous. Its thorax and the first segment of its abdomen are white; the other segments are fuscous. Its forewings are thickly speckled and striated with brown, fulvous and black, the inner area white slightly marked with fuscous. There is a white spot on the cilia. Its hindwings have a white costal area, while the rest of the wing is fulvous and striated with black. The outline between the two areas is very irregular. A laden grey marginal line can be seen from the tail at vein 7 to anal angle.

The adult moths have a complex wing pattern consisting of shades of brown. There is a ragged white inner margin on each forewing and along the costa of each hindwing.

References 

Moths described in 1861
Uraniidae
Moths of Japan